Mordan may refer to:
Sampson Mordan (1790-1843), British inventor
Mordan, Iran, a village in Kerman Province, Iran